Page From a Diary is a 1936 play by the British writer Charles Bennett. It is a melodrama set on the Northwest Frontier where a British unit is trapped by the enemy and a Captain's wife is involved in a love triangle.

It ran for 33 performances at the Garrick Theatre in London's West End. The cast included Greer Garson and Ernst Deutsch.

References

Bibliography

 Kabatchnik, Amnon. Blood on the Stage, 1925-1950: Milestone Plays of Crime, Mystery and Detection. Scarecrow Press, 2010.
 Troyan, Michael. A Rose for Mrs. Miniver: The Life of Greer Garson. University Press of Kentucky, 2010.

1936 plays
Plays by Charles Bennett
Plays set in India
West End plays